The List of National Historic Landmarks in Iowa contains the landmarks designated by the U.S. Federal Government for the U.S. state of Iowa.

There are 27 National Historic Landmarks (NHLs) in Iowa.

Key

Current NHLs

|}

Former Iowa NHLs
President (steamboat) formerly in Davenport, Iowa, relocated to Mississippi and thence to Alton, Illinois

National Park Service areas in Iowa
Effigy Mounds National Monument
Herbert Hoover National Historic Site (also an NHL, listed above)

See also
National Register of Historic Places listings in Iowa
List of National Historic Landmarks by state

References

External links

 National Historic Landmarks Program, at National Park Service

Iowa
 
National Historic Landmarks
National Historic Landmarks